A Turn of the Cards is a 1914 American silent short drama film starring William Garwood, Howard Davies, and William E. Lowery.

Cast
 J.W. Cornwall
 Howard Davies
 William Garwood
 Daniel Gilfether
 Lee Hill
 William E. Lowery
 William Nigh
 Jessalyn Van Trump
 Florence Vincent		
 Edna Mae Wilson

External links

1914 drama films
1914 films
Silent American drama films
American silent short films
American black-and-white films
1914 short films
1910s American films